Moritz J. Dobschutz (born Moritz Julius von Dobschütz; March 20, 1831 – June 24, 1913) was a German-American merchant.

Biography
Moritz Dobschutz was born in Rheine, Germany on March 20, 1831. A member of German nobility, he immigrated into the United States in 1856 and became a very prosperous merchant in Belleville, Illinois. He died at his home there on June 24, 1913.

His home in Belleville, a Victorian adaptation of a Greek revival house built in 1866, is now used by the Victorian Home Museum and by the St. Clair County Historical Society.

References

External links
 

1831 births
1913 deaths
People from Rheine
People from the Province of Westphalia
German untitled nobility
German emigrants to the United States
American merchants
19th-century American businesspeople